Asa Edmund Charlton (born 7 December 1977) is an English footballer who plays as a defender for Halesowen Town where he is also club ambassador.

Playing career
A trainee at Kidderminster Harriers, Charlton failed to make the grade at Aggborough and joined local side Willenhall Town. His form soon attracted the attentions of bigger clubs in non-league football, with the youngster joining Telford United before the start of the 1997–98 season. He made only a handful of appearances at the Buck's Head, before leaving at the end of the season to move to America, where he took a break from football to study computer science at the Coastal Carolina University under a football scholarship.

After a year in the States, he returned to the UK, continuing his computer science studies at the University of Wolverhampton. He continued to play football, turning out for the British Universities team for a spell. He returned to the non-league ranks with short spells at Rushall Olympic and Stourport Swifts, before signing for Southern League Premier Division side Worcester City on the eve of the 2002–2003 season.

Used mainly as a substitute, Charlton made only four starts at St. Georges Lane, before joining fellow Southern League side Halesowen Town in January 2003. His stay with the Yeltz was to be the longest of his career to date, as he became a popular figure at the Grove. He was named club captain the following season after their relegation to Southern League West, but fell out of favour at the start of the 2004–2005 season, and moved to newly promoted Conference North side Redditch United. He enjoyed two years of success at the Valley, making seventy appearances for United as they established themselves at step two in English non-league football.

His form for Redditch had caught the eye of a number of clubs, but it was a surprise to all when it emerged that at 29 years old, Charlton was to be given his first chance of professional football at League Two Mansfield Town. He signed for the Stags in November 2006, but made only a handful of appearances as they only just avoided relegation to non-league football.

Released at the end of the season, he moved back to the Bucks Head, to join newly promoted AFC Telford United. He became a popular figure in the 2007–08 season, as the Bucks immediately settled into their new surroundings of Conference North. He started the 2008–09 season suspended, and put himself further down the pecking order when he injured himself after dropping a beer barrel on his foot. After recovering, he was sent out on loan to local sides Shifnal Town and Stourbridge to gain match practice.

The left-back left the Conference North side Redditch United in 2010 and signed with Corby Town.

His next move was to re-join former club Worcester City. This was followed by a switch to Leamington in October 2011 where he made his debut on 4 October against Chippenham Town.

Hinckley United 
In June 2013, it was announced that Charlton had joined Hinckley United ahead of the 2013–14 Southern Football League season, under the new management of Stuart Storer and Andy Penny.

Return to Halesowen
Charlton returned to former team Halesowen Town for the 2013–14 Northern Premier League season and extended his contract for the 2017–18 Northern Premier League season.

Rushall Olympic
Following on from his release by Halesowen Town, Charlton joined Southern League Premier Central rivals Rushall Olympic on 28 December 2018.

In August 2022, Charlton returned to Halesowen Town as an ambassador of the club where he would still be training with the first-team as well as supporting the owners off the field.

References

External links
 

1977 births
English footballers
Willenhall Town F.C. players
Telford United F.C. players
Rushall Olympic F.C. players
Stourport Swifts F.C. players
Worcester City F.C. players
Halesowen Town F.C. players
Redditch United F.C. players
Mansfield Town F.C. players
AFC Telford United players
Shifnal Town F.C. players
Stourbridge F.C. players
Hednesford Town F.C. players
Corby Town F.C. players
Leamington F.C. players
Hinckley United F.C. players
Living people
English Football League players
Association football defenders